TikTok Radio is a satellite radio station which plays upbeat pop and rock music.

History 
The channel, formerly known as SiriusXM Spotlight debuted along with Turbo, PopRocks and Faction Punk (formerly Faction), Faction, which used to be housed on Sirius XM Radio 41, is now on Sirius XM Radio 314.

SiriusXM Love has been moved to Sirius XM Radio 70, and channel 17 is now PopRocks.

Pitbull's Globalization Radio moved from Sirius XM Radio 4 to Sirius XM Radio 13.

B.B. King's Bluesville moved from Sirius XM Radio 70 to Sirius XM Radio 74.

Metropolitan Opera Radio moved from Sirius XM Radio 74 to Sirius XM Radio 335.

The channel debuted on June 18, 2019.

See also 
List of Sirius XM Radio channels

References

External links 
 http://www.siriusxm.com/soulcycleradio

Sirius Satellite Radio channels
XM Satellite Radio channels
Sirius XM Radio channels
Dance radio stations
Rhythmic contemporary radio stations
Radio stations established in 2017